Joseph J. Piskula (born July 5, 1984) is an American former professional ice hockey defenseman who played in the National Hockey League (NHL). Piskula ended his playing career serving as an alternate captain for HC TPS in the Finnish Liiga.

Playing career
A native of Antigo, Wisconsin, of Croatian ancestry, Piskula played junior hockey with the Chicago Steel and Des Moines Buccaneers of the United States Hockey League (USHL). He was recruited to play with the Wisconsin Badgers hockey program, and was a member of the team for three seasons between 2004 and 2007.  He appeared in 112 games for the Badgers and was given the Otto Breitenbach Award as the team's most improved player in 2005–06. An undrafted player, Piskula chose to forgo his senior year of eligibility by signing as a free agent with the Los Angeles Kings on March 21, 2007.  He made his NHL debut two nights later, against the Chicago Blackhawks, and played in five games with Los Angeles at the end of the 2006–07 NHL season.

Piskula spent the following three seasons playing in the American Hockey League (AHL) with the Kings' affiliate, the Manchester Monarchs. He appeared in 189 games over that time, scoring 2 goals and 29 assists.  As a free agent in 2010, he was offered a try-out with the Philadelphia Flyers, but ultimately signed a contract with the AHL's Abbotsford Heat.  His play in Abbotsford during the 2010–11 season impressed the Heat's parent club, leading the Calgary Flames to sign him to an NHL two-way contract on July 1, 2011. He spent the majority of the season with Abbotsford, but earned a recall to Calgary on December 1, 2011.  He appeared in five games with the Flames before being returned to Abbotsford.

During the 2012–13 season whilst with the Abbotsford Heat, Piskula was traded by the Flames to the Nashville Predators in exchange for Brian McGrattan on February 28, 2013 and was reassigned to AHL affiliate, the Milwaukee Admirals. On October 9, 2014, Piskula was named Captain of the Milwaukee Admirals.

On July 1, 2015, Piskula joined his fourth organization as a free agent in signing a one-year, two-way contract with the Anaheim Ducks. Primarily added to add depth to the Ducks, Piskula was reassigned and named the captain of the San Diego Gulls of the AHL. During the 2015–16 season, Piskula was recalled to the Ducks for 1 game but ended up being a healthy scratch.

As a free agent from the Ducks, Piskula opted to pursue a career abroad, signing a one-year deal with Swedish club, Leksands IF of the SHL on September 13, 2016.

Career statistics

References

External links

1984 births
Living people
Abbotsford Heat players
American men's ice hockey defensemen
American people of Croatian descent
Calgary Flames players
Chicago Steel players
Des Moines Buccaneers players
Ice hockey players from Wisconsin
Ilves players
Leksands IF players
Los Angeles Kings players
Manchester Monarchs (AHL) players
Milwaukee Admirals players
Nashville Predators players
People from Antigo, Wisconsin
San Diego Gulls (AHL) players
HC TPS players
Undrafted National Hockey League players
Wisconsin Badgers men's ice hockey players